Elk Township is one of nineteen townships in Ashe County, North Carolina, United States. The township had a population of 613 as of the 2010 census.

Elk Township occupies  in southwestern Ashe County. There are no incorporated municipalities located in Elk Township, but there are several unincorporated communities, including Todd.

References

Townships in Ashe County, North Carolina